Fear No Evil is a 1945 Italian drama film directed by Giuseppe Maria Scotese and starring Fosco Giachetti, Adriana Benetti and Liliana Laine. It is based on a book written by Diego Fabbri about the life of Benedict of Nursia.

Plot
Italy, February 1944. Some civilians are fleeing the bombing of Monte Cassino (depicted with actual footage from World War II newsreels). One of them, looking on helplessly as the abbey is being blown up, cries that God has forsaken mankind. Another refugee, who happens to be a friar from the abbey, retorts that it is not true and proceeds to narrate how, even at the time of the fall of the Western Roman Empire, in a wasteland similar to World War II, God produced a man like Benedict of Nursia whose sanctity helped restore the European civilization.

At this point the movie flashbacks to 500 AD. Benedict, a Roman nobleman, leaves his privileged patrician heritage and withdraws in a cave, willing to live according to the Gospels. Little by little he assembles a community of fellow monks, and he dedicates his entire life to teaching the Christian disciplines, becoming a Saint in the process and performing several miracles for the glory of God.

Review
«One might expect a rather static, slow-paced film with this subject, but this film moves at a brisk pace with a good deal of action sequences which keep up a lively interest for viewers. Fosco Giachietti plays the title role with gravity, dignity and authority, portraying the humility and dedication of the saint. Alfredo Varelli is a standout as the macho young Marco, a warlike mountain shepherd who becomes Benedict's first adherent and most loyal supporter. Altogether a fascinating account of the founding of the first Christian monastic order, very effective even in the English dubbed version».

Cast

 Fosco Giachetti as Benedict 
 Adriana Benetti as Faustina 
 Liliana Laine as Sabina 
 Nino Pavese as Zalla 
 Alfredo Varelli as Marco
 Manoel Roero as Nicandro
 Virgilio Tomassini as Terenzio 
 Anna Maria Padoan as Livia

References

External links

See also
Benedictine Order
Middle Ages in film

1945 films
1940s Italian-language films
Films about Catholicism
Films about Christianity
Italian black-and-white films
Films directed by Giuseppe Maria Scotese
Films scored by Giovanni Fusco
Films set in Lazio
Italian drama films
1945 drama films
Minerva Film films
1940s Italian films